The 2012 Illinois Fighting Illini football team represented the University of Illinois at Urbana–Champaign in the 2012 NCAA Division I FBS football season. They were led by first-year head coach Tim Beckman, and played their home games at Memorial Stadium. They were a member of the Leaders Division of the Big Ten Conference. Illinois finished the 2012 season with 2–10, 0–8 in Big 10 Leaders play, where they placed last and failed to become bowl eligible for first time since 2009.

Schedule

Roster

References

Illinois
Illinois Fighting Illini football seasons
Illinois Fighting Illini football